Christianity has through Church history produced a number of Christian creeds, confessions and statements of faith. The following lists are provided.

In many cases, individual churches will address further doctrinal questions in a set of bylaws. Smaller churches see this as a formality, while churches of a larger size build this to be a large document describing the practical functioning of the church.

Biblical creeds

Jesus is Lord (Romans 10:9; 1 Corinthians 12:3)
Pre-New Testament Creeds in the New Testament (1 Timothy 2:5, Phil 2:6-11, 1 Timothy 3:16)
Christ died, was raised, then list of eyewitnesses to the resurrection (1 Corinthians 15:3-10)

Ecumenical and historic Christian creeds

Creeds of the early church
 The Didache (50–100)
 The Creed of Aristides of Athens (130)
 The Old Roman Symbol or Old Roman Creed (c. 215)
 The Creed of Cyprian of Carthage (250)
 The Deir Balyzeh Papyrus (200–350)
 The Creeds of Arius and Euzoius (320/327)
 The Creed of Alexander of Alexandria (321–324)
 The First Synod of Antioch (325)
 The Second Dedication of Antioch (341)
 The Baptismal Creed of Jerusalem (350)
 The Apostolic Constitutions (350–380)

Interdenominational creeds

Barmen Declaration of Faith, Confessing Church (1934)
World Evangelical Alliance Statement of Faith (1951)
National Association of Evangelicals Statement of Faith (1943)
Anglican-Lutheran Pullach Report (1972)
Brief Statement of Faith (1983)
Common Christological Declarations Between the Catholic Church and the Assyrian Church of the East (1994)

Ecumenical creeds

The Call to Unity, Lausanne (1927)
The Scheme of Union of the Church of South India (1929/1942)
The Grace of our Lord Jesus Christ, Edinburgh (1937)
Affirmation of Union, Edinburgh (1937)
The Constitution of the Church in South India (1947)
Message of the First Assembly of the World Council of Churches (1948)
The Unity We Have and Seek (1952)
A Message from the Second Assembly of the World Council of Churches (1954)
The Unity of the Church, St. Andrews (1960)
The Church's Unity, World Council of Churches, New Delhi (1961)
The Holy Spirit and the Catholicity of the Church, Uppsala (1968)
What Unity Requires, Nairobi (1975)
Baptism, Eucharist, and Ministry, Lima (1982)
Uniatism, Method of Union of the Past, and the Present Search for Full Communion (1993)
The Covenant (2015)

Denominational creeds

Adventist

Pillars of Adventism (1848)
Adventist Baptismal Vow (1941) 
28 Fundamental Beliefs (Adventist) (1980)

Anabaptist/Mennonite

Hans Denck's confession Before the Council of Nuremberg (1525)
The Schleitheim Confession (1527)
The Mennonite Concept of Cologne (1591)
The Dordrecht Confession (1632)

Anglican

The Anglican Catechism (1549/1662)
Thirty-Nine Articles (1563)
Lambeth Articles (1595)
Affirmation of St. Louis (1977)

Arminian

Five Articles of Remonstrance (1610)
The Opinions of the Remonstrants (1618)
Remonstrant Confession (1621)

Assemblies of God

Assemblies of God Statement of Fundamental Truths
Assembleia de deus Declaration of faith - Brazil

Baptist

Thomas Helwys Confession of Faith (1611)
Baptist Confession of Faith (1644)
Baptist Confession of Faith (1677/1689)
The Orthodox Creed of the General Baptists (1678)
The Philadelphia Confession (1688)
New Hampshire Confession of Faith (1833)
The Free-will Baptist Confession (1868)
Abstract Principles for Southern Baptist Seminary (1858)
The Doctrinal Basis of the New Zealand Baptist Union (1882)
Doctrinal Basis of the Baptist Union of Victoria, Australia (1888)
The Statement of the Baptist Union of Great Britain and Ireland (1888)
The Statement of Faith of the American Baptist Association (1905)
Johann Kargel's Confession (1913)
Baptist Faith and Message, Southern Baptist Convention (1925)
The Doctrinal Statement of the North American Baptist Association (1950)
Baptist Faith and Message, Southern Baptist Convention (1964)
Baptist Affirmation of Faith, Strict Baptist Assembly (1966)
Romanian Baptist Confession (1974)
The Statement of Beliefs of the North American Baptist Conference (1982)
Baptist Faith and Message, Southern Baptist Convention (2000)

Catholic 
The Edict of Michael Cerularius and of the Synod of Constantinople of 1054 (1054)
The Dictatus Papae of Pope Gregory VII (1075)
Council of Florence
Confutatio Augustana (1530)
Tridentine Creed - Profession of Faith of Pius IV (1564)
Anti-Modernist Oath - Pius X
Maasai Creed, Holy Ghost Fathers (1960)
Vatican II Council, Dogmatic Constitution on the Church (1964)
Credo of the People of God Profession of Faith of Paul VI (1968)
Common Declaration of Pope John Paul II and [Armenian] Catholicos Karekin I (1996)
Ad Tuendam Fidem of Pope John Paul II (1998)

Christian Church (Disciples of Christ)

Mission, Vision and Confession
Christian Church: The Design for the Christian Church (1968)

Congregational

The Cambridge Platform (1648)
Savoy Declaration (1658)
The Declaration of the Congregational Union of England (1833)
The Declaration of the Boston National Council (1865)
The Declaration of the Oberlin National Council (1871)
The "Commission" Creed of the Congregational Church (1883/1913)

Eastern Orthodox

 Doctrine of the African Orthodox Church (1921)

Huguenot

Guanabara Confession of Faith

Lutheran
The Ninety-Five Theses (1517)
Augsburg Confession (1520)
Augsburg Confession (1530)
Apology of the Augsburg Confession (1530 Lutheran Response to Confutatio Augustana)
Smalcald Articles (1537)
Treatise on the Power and Primacy of the Pope (1537)
Formula of Concord (1577)
Book of Concord (1580)
Saxon Visitation Articles (1592)
The Reaffirmed Consensus of the Trinity Lutheran Faith (1655)

Methodist

Minutes of Some Late Conversations (1744)
The Scripture Way of Salvation (1765)
Articles of Religion (1784)
Confession of Faith, United Methodist Church (1968)
Soldier's Covenant of the Salvation Army, a church created by former Methodists

Moravian
The three Ecumenical Creeds: Apostles', Nicene and Athanasian
The Augsburg Confession
The Confession of the Unity of the Bohemian Brethren of 1535
The Barmen Declaration of 1934
The Thirty-Nine Articles of the Church of England

Pentecostal

Assemblies of God Statement of Fundamental Truths (1916)
Indian Pentecostal Church of God: Statement of Faith

Presbyterian

Scots Confession (1560)
Westminster Confession of Faith (1646)
The Confession of the Waldenses (1655)
The Confession of the Cumberland Presbyterian Church (1814/1883)
The Confession of the Free Evangelical Church of Geneva (1848)
The Confession of the Free Italian Church (1870)
The Auburn Declaration (1837)
Auburn Affirmation (PCUSA) (1924)
Book of Confessions (PCUSA)[part 1; Second Edition 1970]
The Creed of the Evangelical Presbyterian Church of Chile (1983)
Living Faith: A statement of Christian Belief, Presbyterian Church in Canada (1984)

Puritan/Congregational

Cambridge Platform (1648)

Quaker

The Confession of the Society of Friends (1675)
Richmond Declaration (1887)

Reformed

The Sixty-seven Articles of Ulrigh Zwingli (1523)
The Evangelical Counsel of Ansbach (1524)
Ten Conclusions of Berne (1528)
First Helvetic Confession (1536)
The Consensus of Geneva (1552)
First Scotch Confession (1560)
Craig's Catechism (1581)
Second Helvetic Confession (1586)
Gallican Confession (1559)
Belgic Confession (1561)
Heidelberg Catechism (1563)
The Hungarian Confession (1570)
Second Scotch Confession (1580)
Irish Articles (1615)
Canons of Dordt (1618–19)
Westminster Confession of Faith 1646
Savoy Declaration 1658
Helvetic Consensus (1675)
Second London Confession of Faith (1677/1689)
Walcheren Articles (1693)
Belhar Confession, Dutch Reformed Mission Church (1986)
Cambridge Declaration (1996)

Salvation Army

Articles of War of The Salvation Army

United Church of Canada

A New Creed (1968)

United Church of Christ

Statement of Faith of the United Church of Christ (1959/1977)

Waldensian

Waldensian Confession (1655)

Creeds of specific movements

Neo-Evangelical

Doctrinal Statement of the Evangelical Theological Society (1949, 1990)
Chicago Statement on Biblical Inerrancy (1978)
Chicago Statement on Biblical Hermeneutics (1982)
Danvers Statement (1988)

See also
 Church covenant

References

Bibliography
 
 

Christian statements of faith
Language and mysticism